Norman Price may refer to:

Norman Mills Price (1877–1951), illustrator
Norman Price (American football) (born 1994), American football lineman

See also
Norman Price (Fireman Sam)